Galen Luther Stone (July 4, 1921 – January 23, 2018) was an American diplomat who was an official in the United States Department of State.

Biography
Stone was born on July 4, 1921, in Brookline, Massachusetts. He served in the United States Army during World War II.  He later joined the United States Foreign Service. Joined the foreign service in 1947, from 1978 to 1981 he was the United States Ambassador to Cyprus. He also had postings in Germany, France, Vietnam and India.

His grandfather, also Galen Luther Stone (1862–1926) was a financier and philanthropist, and a major benefactor of Wellesley College. Stone died in January 2018 at the age of 96.

References

1921 births
2018 deaths
Ambassadors of the United States to Cyprus
United States Army personnel of World War II
United States Foreign Service personnel
People from Brookline, Massachusetts
American expatriates in Germany
American expatriates in France
American expatriates in Vietnam
American expatriates in India